Zhēngyuè is the first month of the year in the Chinese calendar. In general, the Vernal Showers are in Zhēngyuè. The name comes from the annual morale-building rite in ancient China.

Zhēngyuè 1 is the day of the rooster; Zhēngyuè 2 is the day of the dog; Zhēngyuè 3 is the day of the pig; Zhēngyuè 4 is the day of the goat; Zhēngyuè 5 is the day of the ox; Zhēngyuè 6 is the day of the horse; Zhēngyuè 7 is the day of the human.

Festivals
New Year's Day is Zhēngyuè 1. The following New Year's Day is February 12, 2021, which is a statutory holiday.
The Yuanxiao Festival is Zhēngyuè 15. The following Yuanxiao is February 26, 2021.

Birth
Wu Zetian, the only female emperor of China, Zhēngyuè 23, 624
Li Bai, a Chinese poet acclaimed to this day as a genius and romantic figure who took traditional poetic forms to new heights, Zhēngyuè 16, 701
Emperor Shunzong of Tang, an emperor of the Chinese Tang Dynasty, Zhēngyuè 12, 761
Bai Juyi, a Chinese poet of the Tang Dynasty, Zhēngyuè 20, 772
Emperor Xizong of Jin, an emperor of the Jin Dynasty which controlled northern China from 1115 to 1234, Zhēngyuè 17, 1119
Qiu Chuji, a Daoist disciple of Wang Chongyang, Zhēngyuè 9, 1148
Itō Suketaka, a samurai, daimyō and twelfth family leader of the Itō clan, Zhēngyuè 15, 1559
Li Hongzhang, a politician, general, and diplomat of the late Qing Empire, Zhēngyuè 5, 1823
Aisin-Gioro Puyi, the last emperor of China and the twelfth and final ruler of the Qing dynasty, Zhēngyuè 14, 1906

Death
Sun Jian, a military general and warlord who lived in the late Eastern Han dynasty, Zhēngyuè 7, 191
Guan Yu, a general serving under the warlord Liu Bei in the late Eastern Han dynasty, Zhēngyuè 13, 220
Cao Cao, a warlord and the penultimate chancellor of the Eastern Han dynasty who rose to great power in the final years of the dynasty, Zhēngyuè 23, 220
Emperor Xianzong of Tang, an emperor of the Chinese Tang Dynasty, Zhēngyuè 27, 820
Emperor Yingzong of Song, the fifth emperor of the Song Dynasty of China, Zhēngyuè 7, 1067
Emperor Zhezong of Song, the seventh emperor of the Song Dynasty of China, Zhēngyuè 12, 1100
Kublai Khan, the fifth Khagan (Great Khan) of the Ikh Mongol Uls (Mongol Empire), reigning from 1260 to 1294, and the founder of the Yuan dynasty in Mongolia and China, Zhēngyuè 22, 1294
Shunzhi Emperor, the third emperor of the Qing dynasty and the first Qing emperor to rule over China, from 1644 to 1661, Zhēngyuè 30, 1638 
Qianlong Emperor, the sixth emperor of the Manchu-led Qing Dynasty, and the fourth Qing emperor to rule over China proper, Zhēngyuè 3, 1799 
Daoguang Emperor, a Qing emperor, Zhēngyuè 14, 1850

Chinese calendars